This is a list of presidents and vice-chancellors of Queen's University Belfast:

1908–1923: Rev. Thomas Hamilton
1924–1933: Sir Richard Livingstone
1934–1938: Sir Frederick Ogilvie
1939–1949: Sir David Keir
1950–1959: Lord Ashby of Brandon
1959–1966: Michael Grant CBE
1966–1976: Sir Arthur Vick
1976–1986: Sir Peter Froggatt
1986–1997: Sir Gordon Beveridge
1998–2004: Sir George Bain
2004–2013: Sir Peter Gregson 
2014–2017: Patrick Johnston
2017–2018: James McElnay
2018–: Ian Greer

See also
List of chancellors of Queen's University Belfast

References

 
Queens
Queens
Vice-Chancellors of Queen's University
Queens